The 2017 New York Mets season was the franchise's 56th season and the team's ninth season at Citi Field. The Mets opened the season on April 3 against the Atlanta Braves and finished the season on October 1 against the Philadelphia Phillies at Citizens Bank Park.

Just two years removed from a World Series appearance, the Mets had high expectations. However, the season was a major disappointment with injuries to key players, poor performances from players such as Yoenis Cespedes, Matt Harvey, and Robert Gsellman, and by controversy within the organization and around players. The Mets thus finished in the 4th place in their division, missed the playoffs for the first time since 2014, and equaled their worst record since 2009. Manager Terry Collins announced his retirement following the final game of the season.

Offseason
On November 14, 2016, second baseman Neil Walker accepted a qualifying offer, returning to the Mets for $17.2 million.

On October 29, 2016, Yoenis Cespedes re-signed with the Mets for $110 million for 4 years. This was the Mets second biggest free agent signing in their history at the time after Carlos Beltran's $119 million deal in 2005.

On January 27, 2017, Jerry Blevins re-signed with the Mets for a one-year deal with an option for 2018.

Fernando Salas re-signed with the Mets for a one-year deal.

Season standings

National League East

National League Division Leaders

Record vs. opponents

Regular season

Opening Day

The Mets began their 2017 season with a 6–0 win over the Atlanta Braves.

Game log

|-  style="text-align:center; background:#cfc"
| 1 || April 3 || Braves || 6–0 || Robles (1–0) || Krol (0–1) || – || Citi Field (44,384) || 1–0
|-  style="text-align:center; background:#fbb"
| 2 || April 5 || Braves || 1–3 (12) || Johnson (1–0) || Montero (0–1) || – || Citi Field (36,137) || 1–1
|-  style="text-align:center; background:#cfc"
| 3 || April 6 || Braves || 6–2 || Harvey (1–0)|| García (0–1) || — || Citi Field  (23,100) || 2–1
|-  style="text-align:center; background:#fbb"
| 4 || April 7 || Marlins|| 2–7 || Chen (1–0) || Wheeler (0–1) || — || Citi Field  (27,891) || 2–2
|-  style="text-align:center; background:#fbb"
| 5 || April 8 || Marlins|| 1–8 || Conley (1–0) || Gsellman (0–1) ||—|| Citi Field  (33,936) || 2–3
|-  style="text-align:center; background:#cfc"
| 6 || April 9 || Marlins || 5–2 || Syndergaard (1–0) ||  Volquez (0–1) || Reed (1) || Citi Field  (27,420) || 3–3 
|-  style="text-align:center; background:#cfc"
| 7 || April 10 || @ Phillies || 4–3 || Blevins (1–0) || Ramos (0–1) || Reed (2) || Citizens Bank Park (33,359) || 4–3
|-  style="text-align:center; background:#cfc"
| 8 || April 11 || @ Phillies || 14–4 || Harvey (2–0) || Buchholz (0–1) || — || Citizens Bank Park (28,659) || 5–3
|-  style="text-align:center; background:#cfc"
| 9 || April 12 || @ Phillies || 5–4 || Wheeler (1–1) || Velasquez (0–2) || Reed (3) || Citizens Bank Park (28,272) || 6–3
|-  style="text-align:center; background:#cfc"
| 10 || April 13 || @ Marlins || 9–8 (16) || Robles (2–0) || Conley (1–1) || — || Marlins Park (23,192) || 7–3 
|-  style="text-align:center; background:#fbb"
| 11 || April 14 || @ Marlins || 2–3 || Ramos (1–1) || Edgin (0–1) || — || Marlins Park (24,194) || 7–4
|-  style="text-align:center; background:#fbb"
| 12 || April 15 || @ Marlins || 4–5 || Tazawa (1–0)|| Salas (0–1) || Ramos (2) || Marlins Park (25,137) || 7–5 
|-  style="text-align:center; background:#fbb"
| 13 || April 16 || @ Marlins || 2–4 || Phelps (2–1) || Reed (0–1) || — || Marlins Park (20,058) || 7–6 
|-  style="text-align:center; background:#fbb"
| 14 || April 18 || Phillies || 2–6 (10) || García (1–0) || Montero (0–2) || — || Citi Field  (23,536) || 7–7 
|-  style="text-align:center; background:#cfc"
| 15 || April 19 || Phillies || 5–4 || Robles (3–0) || Ramos (0–2) || Reed (4) || Citi Field  (22,243) || 8–7 
|-  style="text-align:center; background:#fbb"
| 16 || April 20 || Phillies || 4–6 || Nola (2–0) || Syndergaard (1–1) || Neris (1) || Citi Field  (24,656) || 8–8 
|-  style="text-align:center; background:#fbb"
| 17 || April 21 || Nationals || 3–4 (11) || Romero (1–0) || Smoker (0–1) || Kelley (3) || Citi Field (34,773) || 8–9
|-  style="text-align:center; background:#fbb"
| 18 || April 22 || Nationals || 1–3 || Gonzalez (2–0) || DeGrom (0–1) || Glover (1)  || Citi Field (42,145) || 8–10
|-  style="text-align:center; background:#fbb"
| 19 || April 23 || Nationals || 3–6 || Scherzer (3–1) || Wheeler (1–2) || Glover (2) || Citi Field (27,044) || 8–11
|-  style="text-align:center; background:#cccccc"
|  || April 25 || Braves || colspan=4| Postponed (rain); rescheduled for September 25 as part of a doubleheader || Citi Field ||
|-  style="text-align:center; background:#fbb"
| 20 || April 26 || Braves || 2–8 || Teherán (2–1) || Gsellman (0–2) || — ||  Citi Field (22,819) || 8–12 
|-  style="text-align:center; background:#fbb"
| 21 || April 27 || Braves || 5–7 || Dickey (2–2) || Harvey (2–1) || — ||  Citi Field (23,243) || 8–13 
|-  style="text-align:center; background:#cfc"
| 22 || April 28 || @ Nationals || 7–5 || DeGrom (1–1) || Scherzer (3–2) || Edgin (1) || Nationals Park (34,562) || 9–13
|-  style="text-align:center; background:#cfc"
| 23 || April 29 || @ Nationals || 5–3 || Robles (4–0) || Strasburg (2–1) || Familia (1) || Nationals Park (36,501) || 10–13 
|-  style="text-align:center; background:#fbb"
| 24 || April 30 || @ Nationals || 5–23 || Albers (1–0) || Syndergaard (1–2) || – || Nationals Park (36,806) || 10–14
|-

|-  style="text-align:center; background:#cfc"
| 25 || May 1 || @ Braves || 7–5 || Gsellman (1–2) || Teherán (2–1)|| Familia (2) || SunTrust Park (21,668) || 11–14
|-  style="text-align:center; background:#fbb"
| 26 || May 2 || @ Braves || 7–9 || Dickey (3–2) || Harvey (2–2) || Johnson (5) || SunTrust Park (21,359) || 11–15 
|-  style="text-align:center; background:#cfc"
| 27 || May 3 || @ Braves || 16–5 || deGrom (2–1) || Colón (1–3) || — || SunTrust Park (22,656) || 12–15 
|-  style="text-align:center; background:#cccccc"
| || May 4 || @ Braves || colspan=4| Postponed (rain); Rescheduled for June 10 as part of a doubleheader|| SunTrust Park ||
|-  style="text-align:center; background:#cfc"
| 28 || May 5 || Marlins || 8–7 || Blevins (2–0)  || Ziegler (1–2) || Familia (3) || Citi Field (25,618) || 13–15
|-  style="text-align:center; background:#cfc"
| 29 || May 6 || Marlins || 11–3 || Gsellman (2–2) || Despaigne (0–1)  || — || Citi Field (33,339) || 14–15
|-  style="text-align:center; background:#fbb"
| 30 || May 7 || Marlins || 0–7 || Ureña (1–0) || Wilk (0–1)  || — || Citi Field (39,197) || 14–16
|-  style="text-align:center; background:#cfc"
| 31 || May 8 || Giants || 4–3 || Familia (1–0) || Osich (0–1) || — || Citi Field (28,453) || 15–16
|-  style="text-align:center; background:#cfc"
| 32 || May 9 || Giants ||  6–1 || Wheeler (2–2) || Samardzija (0–5) || — || Citi Field (29,030) || 16–16 
|-  style="text-align:center; background:#fbb"
| 33 || May 10 || Giants || 5–6 || Morris (1–0) || Familia (1–1) || Law (2) || Citi Field (31,066) || 16–17 
|-  style="text-align:center; background:#fbb"
| 34 || May 12 || @ Brewers || 4–7 || Garza (2–0) || Harvey (2–3) || Hughes (1) || Miller Park (28,306) || 16–18 
|-  style="text-align:center; background:#fbb"
| 35 || May 13 || @ Brewers || 4–11 || Davies (4–2) || Gsellman (2–3) || — || Miller Park (33,849) || 16–19
|-  style="text-align:center; background:#fbb"
| 36 || May 14 || @ Brewers || 9–11 || Feliz (1–4) || Reed (0–2) || Knebel (1) || Miller Park (30,623) || 16–20
|-  style="text-align:center; background:#fbb"
| 37 || May 15 || @ Diamondbacks || 3–7 || de la Rosa (2–0) || Robles (4–1) || — || Chase Field (15,988) || 16–21
|-  style="text-align:center; background:#fbb"
| 38 || May 16 || @ Diamondbacks || 4–5 || Greinke (5–2) || Milone (1–1) || Rodney (10) || Chase Field (17,471) || 16–22
|-  style="text-align:center; background:#fbb"
| 39 || May 17 || @ Diamondbacks || 4–5 (11) || Wilhelmsen (1–1) || Montero (0–3) || — || Chase Field (19,842) || 16–23
|-  style="text-align:center; background:#cfc"
| 40 || May 19 || Angels || 3–0 || deGrom (3–1) || Nolasco (2–3) || Reed (5) || Citi Field (36,542) || 17–23
|-  style="text-align:center; background:#cfc"
| 41 || May 20 || Angels || 7–5 || Wheeler (3–2) || Meyer (2–2) || Reed (6) || Citi Field (37,264) || 18–23
|-  style="text-align:center; background:#fbb"
| 42 || May 21 || Angels || 5–12 || Chavez (4–5) || Milone (1–2) || — || Citi Field (39,501) || 18–24
|-  style="text-align:center; background:#cfc"
| 43 || May 23 || Padres || 9–3 || Harvey (3–3) || Chacín (4–4) || — || Citi Field (24,337) || 19–24
|-  style="text-align:center; background:#fbb"
| 44 || May 24 || Padres || 5–6 || Buchter (3–2) || Smoker (0–2) || Hand (1)|| Citi Field (23,933) || 19–25
|-  style="text-align:center; background:#fbb"
| 45 || May 25 || Padres || 3–4 || Lamet (1–0) || Montero (0–4) || Hand (2)|| Citi Field (24,131) || 19–26
|-  style="text-align:center; background:#cfc"
| 46 || May 26 || @ Pirates || 8–1 || deGrom (4–1) || Kuhl (1–5) || — || PNC Park (29,408) || 20–26
|-  style="text-align:center; background:#fbb"
| 47 || May 27 || @ Pirates || 4–5 (10) || Watson (3–1) || Pill (0–1) || — || PNC Park (31,658) || 20–27 
|-  style="text-align:center; background:#cfc"
| 48 || May 28 || @ Pirates || 7–2 || Harvey (4–3) || Glasnow (2–4) || — || PNC Park (21,828) || 21–27 
|-  style="text-align:center; background:#cfc"
| 49 || May 29 || Brewers || 4–2 || Gsellman (4–3) || Garza (2–2) || Reed (7) || Citi Field (34,830) || 22–27 
|-  style="text-align:center; background:#cfc"
| 50 || May 30 || Brewers || 5–4 (12) || Smoker (1–2) || Peralta (5–4) || — || Citi Field (24,457) || 23–27 
|-  style="text-align:center; background:#fbb"
| 51 || May 31 || Brewers || 1–7 || Guerra (1–0) || deGrom (4–2) || — || Citi Field (26,517) || 23–28
|-

|-  style="text-align:center; background:#fbb"
| 52 || June 1 || Brewers || 1–2 || Anderson (4–1) || Wheeler (3–3) || Knebel (4) || Citi Field (35,123) || 23–29
|-  style=background:#fbb
| 53 || June 2 || Pirates || 7–12 || Cole (3–5) || Sewald (0–1) || — || Citi Field (33,047) || 23–30
|-  style=background:#cfc
| 54 || June 3 || Pirates || 4–2 || Gsellman (4–3) || Glasnow (2–5) || Reed (8) || Citi Field (34,035) || 24–30
|-  style=background:#fbb
| 55 || June 4 || Pirates || 1–11 || Williams (3–3) || Pill (0–2) || — || Citi Field (35,323) || 24–31
|-  style=background:#fbb
| 56 || June 6 || @ Rangers || 8–10 || Bibens-Dirkx (1–0) || deGrom (4–3) || — || Globe Life Park in Arlington (32,617) || 24–32
|-  style=background:#cfc
| 57 || June 7 || @ Rangers || 4–3 || Blevins (3–0) || Bush (2–1) || Reed (9) || Globe Life Park in Arlington (32,477) || 25–32
|-  style=background:#fbb
| 58 || June 9 || @ Braves || 2–3 || Johnson (4–1) || Salas (0–2) || — || SunTrust Park (36,791) || 25–33
|-  style=background:#cfc
| 59 || June 10 (1) || @ Braves || 6–1 || Gsellman (5–3) || Newcomb (0–1) || Reed (10) || SunTrust Park (27,684) || 26–33
|-  style=background:#cfc
| 60 || June 10 (2) || @ Braves || 8–1 || Matz (1–0) || Wisler (0–1) || — || SunTrust Park (40,174) || 27–33
|-  style=background:#cfc
| 61 || June 11 || @ Braves || 2–1 || Lugo (1–0) || García (2–5) || Reed (11) || SunTrust Park (30,638) || 28–33
|-  style=background:#cfc
| 62 || June 12 || Cubs || 6–1 || deGrom (5–3) || Lackey (4–7) ||—||Citi Field (33,268) || 29–33
|-  style=background:#fbb
| 63 || June 13 || Cubs || 3–14 || Lester (4–4) || Wheeler (3–4) ||—|| Citi Field (32,651) || 29–34
|-  style=background:#cfc
| 64 || June 14 || Cubs || 9–4 || Blevins (4–0) || Edwards Jr. (2–1) ||—|| Citi Field (34,566) || 30–34
|-  style=background:#fbb
| 65 || June 15 || Nationals || 3–8 || Gonzalez (6–1) || Gsellman (5–4) || — || Citi Field (30,319) || 30–35
|-  style=background:#fbb
| 66 || June 16 || Nationals || 2–7 || Scherzer (8–4) || Matz (1–1) || — || Citi Field (37,119) || 30–36
|-  style=background:#fbb
| 67 || June 17 || Nationals || 4–7 || Strasburg (8–2) || Lugo (1–1) || Romero (2) || Citi Field (38,059) || 30–37
|-  style=background:#cfc
| 68 || June 18 || Nationals || 5–1 || deGrom (6–3) || Ross (3–3) || — || Citi Field (40,459) || 31–37
|-  style=background:#fbb
| 69 || June 19 || @ Dodgers || 6–10 || Kershaw (10–2) || Wheeler (3–5) || — || Dodger Stadium (43,266) || 31–38
|-  style=background:#fbb
| 70 || June 20 || @ Dodgers || 0–12 || McCarthy (6–3) || Gsellman (5–5) || Stewart (1) || Dodger Stadium (47,715) || 31–39
|-  style=background:#fbb
| 71 || June 21 || @ Dodgers || 2–8 || Hill (4–3) || Pill (0–3) || — || Dodger Stadium (42,330) || 31–40
|-  style=background:#fbb
| 72 || June 22 || @ Dodgers || 3–6 || Báez (1–0) || Sewald (0–2) || Jansen (16) || Dodger Stadium (45,967) || 31–41
|-  style=background:#cfc
| 73 || June 23 || @ Giants || 11–4 || Lugo (2–1) || Blach (4–5) || — || AT&T Park (41,769) || 32–41
|-  style=background:#cfc
| 74 || June 24 || @ Giants || 5–2 || deGrom (7–3) || Dyson (0–1) || — || AT&T Park (41,216) || 33–41
|-  style=background:#cfc
| 75 || June 25 || @ Giants || 8–2 || Montero (1–4) || Moore (3–8) || — || AT&T Park (41,137) || 34–41
|-  style=background:#fbb
| 76 || June 27 || @ Marlins || 3–6 || Barraclough (4–1) || Ramirez (0–1) || Ramos (13) || Marlins Park (20,804) || 34–42
|-  style=background:#cfc
| 77 || June 28 || @ Marlins || 8–0 || Matz (2-1) || Locke (0–4) || — || Marlins Park (18,743) || 35–42
|-  style=background:#cfc
| 78 || June 29 || @ Marlins || 6–3 ||  Lugo (3–1) || Ureña (6–3) || Reed (12) || Marlins Park (21,350) || 36–42
|-  style=background:#cfc
| 79 || June 30 || Phillies || 2–1 || deGrom (8–3) || Lively (1–3) || Addison Reed (13) || Citi Field (37,134) || 37–42
|-

|-  style=background:#cfc
| 80 || July 1 || Phillies || 7–6 || Salas (1–2) || Neshek (2–2) || Reed (14) || Citi Field (33,080) || 38–42
|-  style=background:#fbb
| 81 || July 2 || Phillies || 1–7 || Pivetta (2–4) || Montero (1–5) || — || Citi Field (30,343) || 38–43
|-  style=background:#fbb
| 82 || July 3 || @ Nationals || 2–3 || Albers (4–1) || Sewald (0–3) || — ||  Nationals Park (41,681) || 38–44
|-  style="text-align:center; background:#fbb
| 83 || July 4 || @ Nationals || 4–11 || Ross (5–3) || Lugo (3–2) || — || Nationals Park (37,120) || 38–45
|-  style="text-align:center; background:#cccccc"
|  || July 5 || @ Nationals || colspan=4| Postponed (rain); Rescheduled for August 27 as part of a doubleheader || Nationals Park ||
|-  style="text-align:center; background:#cfc
| 84 || July 7 || @ Cardinals || 6–5 || deGrom (9–3) || Martinez (6–8) || Reed (15) || Busch Stadium (43,849) || 39–45
|-  style="text-align:center; background:#fbb
| 85 || July 8 || @ Cardinals || 1–4 || Wainwright (10–5) || Wheeler (3–6)  || Oh (18) || Busch Stadium (44,013) || 39–46
|-  style="text-align:center; background:#fbb
| 86 || July 9 || @ Cardinals || 0–6 || Lynn (7–6) || Matz (2–2) || — || Busch Stadium (42,925) || 39–47
|- style="text-align:center; background:#bbb;"
|colspan=9| All–Star Break (July 10–13)
|-  style="text-align:center; background:#cfc;"
| 87 || July 14 || Rockies || 14–2 || deGrom (10–3) || Gray (2–1) || — || Citi Field (27,582) || 40–47
|-  style="text-align:center; background:#cfc"
| 88 || July 15 || Rockies || 9–3 || Lugo (4–2) || Chatwood (6–11) || — || Citi Field (34,783) || 41–47
|-  style="text-align:center; background:#fbb"
| 89 || July 16 || Rockies || 4–13 || Hoffman (6–1) || Matz (2–3) ||　— || Citi Field (28,745) || 41–48
|-  style="text-align:center; background:#fbb"
| 90 || July 17 || Cardinals || 3–6 || Wainwright (11–5) || Wheeler (3-7) || Cecil (1) || Citi Field (29,977) || 41–49
|-  style="text-align:center; background:#fbb"
| 91 || July 18 || Cardinals || 0–5 || Wacha (7–3) || Montero (1–6) || — || Citi Field (29,964) || 41–50
|-  style="text-align:center; background:#cfc"
| 92 || July 19 || Cardinals || 7–3 || deGrom (11–3) || Leake (6–8) || Reed (16) || Citi Field (32,228) || 42–50
|-  style="text-align:center; background:#cfc"
| 93 || July 20 || Cardinals || 3–2 || Reed (1–2) || Rosenthal (2–4) || — || Citi Field (39,640) || 43–50
|-  style="text-align:center; background:#cfc"
| 94 || July 21 || Athletics || 7–5 || Robles (5–1) || Blackburn (1–1) || Blevins (1) || Citi Field (26,969) || 44–50
|-  style="text-align:center; background:#cfc"
| 95 || July 22 || Athletics || 6–5 || Robles (6–1) || Castro (0–1) || — || Citi Field (39,629) || 45–50
|-  style="text-align:center; background:#fbb"
| 96 || July 23 || Athletics || 2–3 || Gossett (2–5) || Montero (1–7) || Casilla (16) || Citi Field (29,037) || 45–51
|-  style="text-align:center; background:#cfc"
| 97 || July 24 || @ Padres || 5–3 || deGrom (12–3) || Richard (5–11) || Reed (17) || Petco Park (23,325) || 46–51
|-  style="text-align:center; background:#cfc"
| 98 || July 25 || @ Padres || 6–5 || Lugo (5–2) || Torres (5–3) || Reed (18) || Petco Park (28,024) || 47–51
|-  style="text-align:center; background:#fbb"
| 99 || July 26 || @ Padres || 3–6 || Chacín (10–7) || Matz (2–4) || Hand (4) || Petco Park (19,281) || 47–52
|-  style="text-align:center; background:#fbb"
| 100 || July 27 || @ Padres || 5–7 || Perdomo (5–5) || Flexen (0–1) || Hand (5) || Petco Park (26,262) || 47–53
|-  style="text-align:center; background:#cfc"
| 101 || July 28 || @ Mariners || 7–5 || Blevins (5–0) || Phelps (2–5) || Reed (19) || Safeco Field (34,543) || 48–53
|-  style="text-align:center; background:#fbb"
| 102 || July 29 || @ Mariners || 2–3 || Gallardo (5–7) || deGrom (12–4) || Diaz (19) || Safeco Field (33,519) || 48–54
|-  style="text-align:center; background:#fbb"
| 103 || July 30 || @ Mariners || 1–9 || Paxton (11–3) || Lugo (5–3) || —  || Safeco Field (31,162) || 48–55
|-

|-  style="text-align:center; background:#fbb"
| 104 || August 1 || @ Rockies || 4–5 || Dunn (3–1) || Robles (6–2) || — || Coors Field (36,698) || 48–56
|-  style="text-align:center; background:#cfc"
| 105 || August 2 || @ Rockies || 10–5 || Bradford (1–0) || Chatwood (6–12) || — || Coors Field (36,945) || 49–56
|-  style="text-align:center; background:#fbb"
| 106 || August 3 || @ Rockies || 4–5 || Holland (2–1) || Robles (6–3) || — || Coors Field (35,276) || 49–57
|-  style="text-align:center; background:#fbb"
| 107 || August 4 || Dodgers || 0–6 || Darvish (1–0) || deGrom (12–5) || — || Citi Field (41,187) || 49–58
|-  style="text-align:center; background:#fbb"
| 108 || August 5 || Dodgers || 4–7 || Morrow (4–0) || Sewald (0–4)  || — || Citi Field (40,060) || 49–59
|-  style="text-align:center; background:#fbb"
| 109 || August 6 || Dodgers || 0–8 || Ryu (4–6)  || Matz (2–5)  || — || Citi Field (27,077) || 49–60
|-  style="text-align:center; background:#cfc"
| 110 || August 8 || Rangers || 5–4 || Flexen (1–1) || Griffin (5–3) ||  Ramos (21) || Citi Field (37,326) || 50–60
|-  style="text-align:center; background:#fbb"
| 111 || August 9 || Rangers || 1–5 || Perez (6–10) || Montero (1–8) || — || Citi Field (34,222) || 50–61
|-  style="text-align:center; background:#cfc"
| 112 || August 10 || @ Phillies || 10–0 || deGrom (13–5) || Velasquez (2–7) || — || Citizens Bank Park (27,716) || 51–61
|-  style="text-align:center; background:#cfc"
| 113 || August 11 || @ Phillies || 7–6 || Robles (7–3) || Neris (4–5) || Ramos (22) || Citizens Bank Park (26,925) || 52–61
|-  style="text-align:center; background:#fbb"
| 114 || August 12 || @ Phillies || 1–3 || Nola (9–7) || Matz (2–6) || García (2) || Citizens Bank Park (34,131) || 52–62
|-  style="text-align:center; background:#cfc"
| 115 || August 13 || @ Phillies || 6–2 || Flexen (2–1) || Eflin (1–4) || — || Citizens Bank Park (24,106) || 53–62
|-  style="text-align:center; background:#fbb"
| 116 || August 14 || @ Yankees || 2–4 || Robertson (6–2) || Robles (7–4) || Betances (7) || Yankee Stadium (45,619) || 53–63
|-  style="text-align:center; background:#fbb"
| 117 || August 15 || @ Yankees || 4–5 || Gray (7–7) || deGrom (13–6) || Chapman (16) || Yankee Stadium (46,474) || 53–64
|-  style="text-align:center; background:#fbb"
| 118 || August 16 || Yankees || 3–5 || Kahnle (2–3) || Sewald (0–5) || Robertson (14) || Citi Field (42,260) || 53–65
|-  style="text-align:center; background:#fbb"
| 119 || August 17 || Yankees || 5–7 || Severino (10–5) || Matz (2–7) || Betances (8) || Citi Field (42,549) || 53–66
|-  style="text-align:center; background:#fbb"
| 120 || August 18 || Marlins || 1–3 || Nicolino (2–1) || Flexen (2–2) || Ziegler (5) || Citi Field (25,951) || 53–67
|-  style="text-align:center; background:#cfc"
| 121 || August 19 || Marlins || 8–1 || Montero (2–8) || Worley (2–3) || — || Citi Field (30,171) || 54–67
|-  style="text-align:center; background:#fbb"
| 122 || August 20 || Marlins || 4–6 || Conley (6–5) || deGrom (13–7) || Ziegler (6) || Citi Field (26,464) || 54–68
|-  style="text-align:center; background:#fbb"
| 123 || August 21 || Diamondbacks || 2–3 (10) || Sherfy (1–0) || Goeddel (0–1) || Rodney (28) || Citi Field (24,265) || 54–69
|-  style="text-align:center; background:#fbb"
| 124 || August 22 || Diamondbacks || 4–7 || Corbin (11–11) || Milone (1–3) || Rodney (29) || Citi Field (25,220) || 54–70
|-  style="text-align:center; background:#cfc"
| 125 || August 23 || Diamondbacks || 4–2 || Flexen (3–2) || Godley (5–7) || Ramos (23) || Citi Field (31,277) || 55–70
|-  style="text-align:center; background:#fbb"
| 126 || August 24 || Diamondbacks || 2–3 || Ray (10–5) || Montero (2–9) || Rodney (30) || Citi Field (25,284) || 55–71
|-  style="text-align:center; background:#cfc"
| 127 || August 25 || @ Nationals || 4–2 || deGrom (14–7) || Cole (1–4) || Ramos (24) ||  Nationals Park (34,036) || 56–71
|-  style="text-align:center; background:#fbb"
| 128 || August 26 || @ Nationals || 4–9 || González (13–5) || Gsellman (5–6) || — || Nationals Park (36,761) || 56–72
|-  style="text-align:center; background:#cfc"
| 129 || August 27 (1) || @ Nationals || 6–5 || Blevins (6–0) || Blanton (2–3) || Ramos (25) || Nationals Park (31,904) || 57–72
|-  style="text-align:center; background:#fbb"
| 130 || August 27 (2) || @ Nationals || 4–5 || Roark (11–8) || Robles (7–5) || Doolittle (16) || Nationals Park (20,624) || 57–73
|-  style="text-align:center; background:#fbb"
| 131 || August 29 || @ Reds || 4–14 || Romano (4–5) || Flexen (3–3) || — || Great American Ball Park (12,946) || 57–74
|-  style="text-align:center; background:#cfc"
| 132 || August 30 || @ Reds || 2–0 || Montero (3–9) || Bailey (4–7) || Ramos (26) || Great American Ball Park (12,491) || 58–74
|-  style="text-align:center; background:#fbb"
| 133 || August 31 || @ Reds || 2–7 || Stephenson (3–4) || deGrom (14–8) || — || Great American Ball Park (13,634) || 58–75
|-

|-  style="text-align:center; background:#fbb"
| 134 || September 2 || @ Astros || 8–12 || Morton (11–6) || Harvey (4–4) || — || Minute Maid Park (30,319) || 58–76
|-  style="text-align:center; background:#fbb"
| 135 || September 2 || @ Astros || 1–4 || Musgrove (7–8) || Lugo (5–4) || Giles (28) || Minute Maid Park (34,904) || 58–77
|-  style="text-align:center; background:#fbb"
| 136 || September 3 || @ Astros || 6–8 || Harris (3–2) || Flexen (3–4) || Devenski (4) || Minute Maid Park (32,065) || 58–78
|-  style="text-align:center; background:#cfc"
| 137 || September 4 || Phillies || 11–7 || Montero (4–9) || Leiter (2–5) || — || Citi Field (28,808) || 59–78
|-  style="text-align:center; background:#fbb"
| 138 || September 5 || Phillies || 1–9 || Lively (3–5) || deGrom (14–9) || — || Citi Field (22,230) || 59–79
|-  style="text-align:center; background:#cfc"
| 139 || September 6 || Phillies || 6–3 (6) || Gsellman (6–6) || Pivetta (5–10) || — || Citi Field (19,617)  || 60–79
|-  style="text-align:center; background:#cfc"
| 140 || September 7 || Reds || 7–2 || Harvey (5–4) || Mahle (0–2) || — || Citi Field (21,274) || 61–79
|-  style="text-align:center; background:#cfc"
| 141 || September 8 || Reds || 5–1 || Lugo (6–4) || Garrett (3–7) || Ramos (27) || Citi Field (25,864) || 62–79
|-  style="text-align:center; background:#cfc"
| 142 || September 9 || Reds || 6–1 || Montero (5–9) || Bailey (4–8) || — || Citi Field (30,661) || 63–79
|-  style="text-align:center; background:#fbb"
| 143 || September 10 || Reds || 5–10 || Stephens (2–0) || Familia (1–2) || Iglesias (26) || Citi Field (27,590) || 63–80
|-  style="text-align:center; background:#fbb"
| 144 || September 12 || @ Cubs || 3–8 || Quintana (10–11) || Gsellman (6–7) || — || Wrigley Field (37,834) || 63–81
|-  style="text-align:center; background:#fbb"
| 145 || September 13 || @ Cubs || 5–17 || Lester (11–7) || Harvey (5–5) || — || Wrigley Field (36,008) || 63–82
|-  style="text-align:center; background:#fbb"
| 146 || September 14 || @ Cubs || 6–14 || Duensing (1–1) || Lugo (6–5) || — || Wrigley Field (37,867) || 63–83
|-  style="text-align:center; background:#fbb"
| 147 || September 15 || @ Braves || 2–3 || Newcomb (3–8) || Montero (5–10) || Vizcaíno (11) || SunTrust Park (29,402) || 63–84
|-  style="text-align:center; background:#cfc"
| 148 || September 16 || @ Braves || 7–3 || deGrom (15–9) || Dickey (9–10) || — || SunTrust Park (37,846) || 64–84
|-  style="text-align:center; background:#cfc"
| 149 || September 17 || @ Braves || 5–1 || Gsellman (7–7) || Teherán (11–12) || — || SunTrust Park (32,785) || 65–84
|-  style="text-align:center; background:#fbb"
| 150 || September 18 || @ Marlins || 1–13 || Straily (10–9) || Harvey (5–6) || Worley (1) || Marlins Park (16,385) || 65–85
|-  style="text-align:center; background:#fbb"
| 151 || September 19 || @ Marlins || 4–5 (10) || Barraclough (6–2)|| Sewald (0–6) || — || Marlins Park (16,405) || 65–86
|-  style="text-align:center; background:#fbb"
| 152 || September 20 || @ Marlins || 2–9 || Ureňa (14–6) || Montero (5–11) || — || Marlins Park (16,033) || 65–87
|-  style="text-align:center; background:#cfc"
| 153 || September 22 || Nationals || 7–6 || Bradford (2–0) || Blanton (2–4) || Familia (4) || Citi Field (28,095) || 66–87
|-  style="text-align:center; background:#fbb"
| 154 || September 23 || Nationals || 3–4 (10) || Solis (1–0) || Rhame (0–1) || Doolittle (23) || Citi Field (34,455) || 66–88
|-  style="text-align:center; background:#fbb"
| 155 || September 24 || Nationals || 2–3 || Scherzer (16–6) || deGrom (15–10) || Kintzler (29) || Citi Field (29,057) || 66–89
|-  style="text-align:center; background:#fbb"
| 156 || September 25 (1) || Braves || 2–9 || Sims (3–5) || Flexen (3–5) || — || Citi Field || 66–90
|-  style="text-align:center; background:#cfc"
| 157 || September 25 (2)|| Braves || 3–2 || Lugo (7–5) || Fried (1–1) || Familia (5) || Citi Field (21,698) || 67–90
|-  style="text-align:center; background:#cfc"
| 158 || September 26 || Braves || 4–3 || Familia (2–2) || Minter (0–1) || — || Citi Field (21,938) || 68–90
|-  style="text-align:center; background:#cfc"
| 159 || September 27 || Braves || 7–1 || Gsellman (8–7) || Newcomb (4–9) || — || Citi Field (28,617) || 69–90
|-  style="text-align:center; background:#fbb"
| 160 || September 29 || @ Phillies || 2–6 || Lively (4–7) || Harvey (5–7) || — || Citizens Bank Park (19,375) || 69–91
|-  style="text-align:center; background:#cfc"
| 161 || September 30 || @ Phillies || 7–4 (11) || Rhame (1–1) || Morgan (3–3) || Familia (6) || Citizens Bank Park (25,138) || 70–91
|-  style="text-align:center; background:#fbb"
| 162 || October 1 || @ Phillies || 0–11 || Pivetta (8–10) || Flexen (3–6) || — || Citizens Bank Park (25,754) || 70–92
|-

Roster

Statistics

Batting

Players in bold are on the active MLB roster as of 2022. (Updated through 10/1/17)

Note: G = Games played; AB = At bats; R = Runs; H = Hits; 2B = Doubles; 3B = Triples; HR = Home runs; RBI = Runs batted in; BB = Walks; SO = Strikeouts; AVG = Batting average; OBP = On-base percentage; SLG = Slugging percentage; SB = Stolen bases

Pitching

Players in bold are on the active MLB roster as of 2022.Note: W = Wins; L = Losses; ERA = Earned run average; G = Games pitched; GS = Games started; SV = Saves; IP = Innings pitched; H = Hits allowed; R = Runs allowed; ER = Earned runs allowed; HR = Home runs allowed; BB = Walks allowed; K = StrikeoutsFarm system

References

External links
2017 New York Mets season Official Site
2017 New York Mets season at Baseball Reference''
2017 New York Mets season at ESPN

New York Mets seasons
New York Mets season
New York Mets
2010s in Queens
Flushing, Queens